Jenny Råghall (born 30 August 1988) is a Swedish ski mountaineer. In 2016 and 2017 she won the Swedish team championship with Ida Nilsson and in 2018 with Caroline Tollstadius. In 2019 she switched to the mixed class which she won with David Lundsten.

Råghall works as a ski patrol member and avalanche technician, presently (2017) in Abisko. In 2012, she was injured but survived an avalanche accident at Tänndalen where the other member of the ski patrol was mortally wounded.

Results

References

Notes

1988 births
Living people
Swedish female ski mountaineers